StarFist is a series of military science fiction novels written by David Sherman and Dan Cragg. The novels are set in the 25th century  and are written from the viewpoint of the men of the Confederation of Human Worlds Marine Corps 34th FIST (Fleet Initial Strike Team). An additional spin-off series, titled StarFist: Force Recon, by the same authors was started in 2005 with the publication of Backshot.

Authors

Dan Cragg was a non-commissioned officer in the United States Army, serving for twenty-two years with eleven years in overseas stations, five and half in Vietnam; at retirement Cragg was a Sergeant Major. He is also a writer of military non-fiction, including Inside the VC and NVA', and many others based around the Vietnam War. He lives in Virginia. Cragg published the first of the StarFist series with coauthor David Sherman.

David Sherman is a former United States Marine, whose military experience has influenced his work from the start of his writing career.

StarFist Series
The Confederation of Human Worlds in the 21st century established its capital city at Fargo, North Dakota, which grew into a large metropolis with a multitude of skyscrapers and government buildings. The military headquarters of the Confederation in Fargo, North Dakota is called the Heptagon. A space navy, an army with air force capability transport space navy ships to whatever planet they are ordered to, and a Marine Corps make up the force. Humans have colonized numerous worlds out several hundred light years and are faced with conflicts involving surrounding extraterrestrials.

A short time after the authors submitted the manuscript of Double Jeopardy the series publisher, Del Rey, decided to cancel the series.

Novels

First to Fight (1997)
School of Fire (1998)
Steel Gauntlet (1999)
Blood Contact (1999)
TechnoKill (2000)
Hangfire (2000)
Kingdom's Swords (2002)
Kingdom's Fury (2003)
Lazarus Rising (2003)
A World of Hurt (2004)
Flashfire (2006)
Firestorm (2007)
Wings of Hell (2008)
Double Jeopardy (2009)

StarFist: Force Recon Series

StarFist: Force Recon describes the experiences of the men and women who carry out intelligence-gathering and small-unit raids behind enemy lines. The Confederation Marine Force Recon mission is very similar to that of United States Marine Corps Force Recon, with which co-author Sherman, a former US Marine, is familiar. The new series did not sell as well as the parent series, and the publisher allowed the series to end after three novels.

Novels
 Backshot (2005)
 PointBlank (2006)
 Recoil (2008)

Critical reception

The novels were criticized for their all-male cast of soldiers, using contrived inter-service rivalries as a plot device, and a "tendency to telegraph their denouements" But as the review of STARFIST: Lazarus Rising stated at the end "The politically correct may have trouble with the lack of female soldiers à la Honor Harrington, but the traditional male audience at which this is targeted will have no complaints.".

References

External links
 Starfist Headquarters, a fan site devoted to the series.

 
Science fiction book series
Space marines
Fiction set in the 25th century
Military science fiction novels